Corsair Artisan Distillery is a small-batch distilling company located in Nashville, Tennessee, USA, and founded in Bowling Green, Kentucky, in January 2008. Corsair Artisan is owned and operated by Darek Bell and Andrew Webber, distillers and Nashville natives. The company has produced innovative spirits including buckwheat whiskey, quinoa whiskey, malted and smoked whiskies, multi-grain bourbons, barrel aged gin, red absinthe, naturally flavored vodka and spiced rum.

History
Childhood friends Webber and Bell started homebrewing beer and wine in Bell's garage after running into some difficulties working on a biodiesel plant prototype. Webber developed the idea after remarking that putting all of their efforts into making whiskey would be far more satisfying.

The distillery began operations in 2008 in Bowling Green, Kentucky. The owners had a strong connection to Tennessee and established a second location in Nashville, Tennessee, in 2010, making Corsair the first legal craft distillery in Nashville since Prohibition. With the slogan "Innovate or Die" in mind, Corsair has produced hundreds of experimental products that include grains such as quinoa, spelt, triticale and buck wheat, as well as hop variations. The quinoa whiskey is considered one of a kind and was featured on 393th episode on the cooking show, Chopped. In addition to whiskey, Corsair produces a small amount of craft beer for consumption at their distilleries.

In 2016, Corsair opened a third location in the Wedgewood/Houston (WeHo) neighborhood in Nashville. Opening the WeHo headquarters gave the company the opportunity to increase production while freeing up capacity at its Marathon Village location. The WeHo site also houses additional office space and barrel storage, deeming the location their headquarters.

On 31 August 2018, Corsair closed the Bowling Green distillery. According to Corsair's chief operating officer, Tyler Crowell, the company plans to focus future efforts on additional expansion of its two locations in Nashville as well as national distribution. 

In March 2020, Corsair launched a rebrand of its spirits to prepare for wider distribution and a smaller line of products, with changes in spirit names and proofs. At this same time, the distillery received local and national media attention for producing hand sanitizer during the COVID-19 pandemic, providing thousands of gallons to healthcare facilities. 

Corsair has a stated goal to put "Nashville in a bottle" by tapping into the resources of Bell's local farm, using its own local malthouse and smokehouse. The company offers tours at its locations in Nashville to show off its craft spirits and local craft beers.

List of spirits 
By 2018, Corsair had produced 28 types of spirits. Currently, 11 are usually offered for sale, six are classified as seasonal or experimental varieties and 11 have been discontinued.

Awards 
In 2018, the company said that its spirits had won more than 800 medals at national and international spirits competitions.

References

External links
 Official web site

Bourbon whiskey
Distilleries in Kentucky
Distilleries in Tennessee